The Centre for the Study of World Christianity (CSWC) is a research centre based in New College, the School of Divinity at the University of Edinburgh. It was founded in the University of Aberdeen by Andrew F. Walls as the Centre for the Study of Christianity in the Non-Western World in 1982, but later moved by Walls to the University of Edinburgh in 1986. Its current name was adopted in 2009.  The centre is currently directed by Alexander Chow and Emma Wild-Wood.

Research 
The centre promotes historical, theological, and social scientific research in the field of World Christianity – broadly speaking, Christianity in Africa, Asia, Latin America, Oceania, and eastern Europe, as well as diasporic forms of non-Western Christianity emerging in contexts such as Western Europe and North America. Closely related to the centre is the peer-reviewed academic journal Studies in World Christianity, published three times a year. The centre is one of the main sponsors of the Yale-Edinburgh Group on the History of the Missionary Movement and World Christianity, and maintains its own research archive.

Some notable books produced by scholars affiliated with the Centre include:
 
 
 
 Chow, Alexander and Emma Wild-Wood (Eds; 2020). Ecumenism and Independency in World Christianity Historical Studies in Honour of Brian Stanley. Leiden: Brill.

Graduate Studies 
As part of the School of Divinity, it offers a one-year MTh teaching program and a PhD research degree producing, by the first decade of the twenty first century, 129 MTh and 65 PhD theses. Some of the centre's notable alumni include:

 Siga Arles, director of the Centre for Contemporary Christianity, Bangalore, India
 Kwame Bediako, former rector for the Afroki-Christaller Institute for Theology, Mission and Culture, Akropong, Ghana
 Jonathan Bonk, executive director emeritus of the Overseas Ministries Study Center in New Haven, Connecticut, U.S.A.
 James L. Cox, honorary professorial fellow of religious studies,  School of Divinity, University of Edinburgh, Scotland
 Edward Fasholé-Luke, professor, Fourah Bay College, Sierra Leone
 Jehu Hanciles, D.W. and Ruth Brooks Associate Professor of World Christianity, Candler School of Theology, Emory University, Atlanta, Georgia, U.S.
 Jooseop Kim, secretary, Council for World Mission and Evangelism, World Council of Churches
 Esther Mombo, deputy vice-chancellor, St. Paul's University, Limuru, Kenya
 Cyril Okorocha, Anglican bishop of Owerri Diocese in Nigeria
 David A. Shank, founder of Group for Religious and Biblical Studies, Blokhosso-Abidjan in Côte d'Ivoire
 Diane Stinton, dean of students and associate professor of mission studies, Regent College, Vancouver, Canada
 Godwin Tasie, professor of Church history, University of Jos, Nigeria
 Timothy Tennent, president of Asbury Theological Seminary, Wilmore, Kentucky, U.S.

References

Sources

External links

 Centre for the Study of Non-Western Christianity
 Studies in World Christianity
 School of Divinity, University of Edinburgh

Research institutes established in 1982
University of Edinburgh
1982 establishments in Scotland
World Christianity